T. Rajambal is an Indian politician and former Member of the Legislative Assembly of Tamil Nadu. She was elected to the Tamil Nadu legislative assembly as an Indian National Congress (Indira) candidate from Talavasal constituency in 1980 election and as an Indian National Congress candidate in 1984 election.

Currently lives at Aragalur

References 

Indian National Congress politicians from Tamil Nadu
Living people
Year of birth missing (living people)
Tamil Nadu MLAs 1980–1984
Tamil Nadu MLAs 1985–1989